The Perrys are a professional Southern gospel quartet based in Hendersonville, Tennessee. The group formed on December 25, 1970 with Randy Perry and his sisters, Debbie and Libbi, in Georgia. In the mid-1980s, the group signed with former pianist for the Happy Goodman Family, Eddie Crook on his Morning Star Records label. Libbi met and married Tracy Stuffle, who would become the groups bass singer. 
Debbie left the group to rear her family and the Perrys were joined by soprano singer Denise Helton.  

During this time, the Perrys experienced enormous growth in their popularity with such songs as "Get Involved", "We Shall Reign", "I Remember The Day", "The Mountain", "He Knows How", "Royal Descendant", "Grace", "The Rock of Ages",  and "Look What I'm Trading for a Mansion".  

In the 1994, after the release of the very popular "Grace" album, Randy Perry left the road to concentrate more on evangelistic work and Denise Helton would also leave the group to pursue other ventures. Band member/minister Kent Barrett left the road to pastor.  Nicole Watts and Barry Scott would come in to fill these spots. Scott soon left the group and was replaced by Mike Bowling, a former member of the New Hinsons. In 1997, the group made a record label transition from Morning Star Records to Daywind Records, owned by Dottie Leonard Miller. They also signed an exclusive booking agreement with Harper and Associates. Their debut album with Daywind, "Crossings", included their first two #1 songs on the Singing News charts, "Not Even a Stone" and "By Faith I Can Touch Him Now".

Mike would also leave to join with The Crabb Family and also pursue his own solo career; and Nicole Watts married and left the group shortly after Mike's departure. David Hill joined the Perrys and held the lead position for approximately nine months. His only album with the group was, "Absolutely, Positively, Live!", which included the #1 hit, "Praise God, It's Settled, I'm Saved". Loren Harris, formerly of the Wilburns, took the lead position shortly afterward.  
The group decided to not fill the position of Nicole Watts with another soprano but to turn that position over to a male - hence the hiring of baritone Curt Davis. It was during this time that the Perrys had their fourth #1 song, "I Rest My Case at the Cross".

In August 2003, Curt Davis resigned his baritone position with the Perrys. Joseph Habedank replaced Davis. Soon after Habedank joined the group, the Perry family patriarch, George Perry, died in November 2003. After the departure of Justin Ellis to perform with the Crabb Family, the Perrys hired Matthew Holt as the group's pianist in September 2004 at the National Quartet Convention. It was around this time that the Perrys had their fifth and latest #1 song, "I Wish I Could Have Been There".

Holt was hired as pianist shortly before the Perrys were awarded their first Singing News Fan Award for Favorite Mixed Quartet of the Year. The Perrys were awarded Singing News Fan Awards for the 2004, 2005 and 2006 Mixed Quartet of the Year. The family received the Harmony Honors Awards for Favorite Album of the Year, This Is the Day, and for Favorite Song of the Year, I Wish I Could Have Been There. Libbi Perry Stuffle was awarded Singing News Fan Awards for the 2005 Female Vocalist and Alto Singer Of The Year and the 2006 Alto Singer of the Year. The Perrys were also awarded the Singing News Fan Award for Album of the Year in 2006 for their album Remembering the Happy Goodmans.

In 2006, longtime lead vocalist Loren Harris resigned his position in order to spend more time at home with his family. Joseph Habedank moved to the vacant lead position and Nick Trammell (son of baritone Mark Trammell) came in to fill the baritone position. The first recording, entitled "Look No Further", under the new line-up was released in September 2007 at the National Quartet Convention. In addition to the release of the album, Nick Trammell received the Horizon Individual award by the Singing News Fans for 2007. In July 2008, Matthew Holt announced his departure. Bryan Elliott joined the Perrys as pianist in August 2008.

It was announced on February 24, 2009, that Nick Trammell was departing. Former sound engineer Troy Peach, who had previously performed with the Wilburns and the Steeles, replaced Trammell. After Troy joined the vocal lineup of the Perrys, the group began work on a new album for Daywind Records. At the 2009 National Quartet Convention, Libbi Perry Stuffle and Joseph Habedank were voted Favorite Alto and Favorite Young Artist respectively in the 2009 Singing News Fan Awards. The group continued their success with the album in 2010 receiving 2 GMA Dove Award nominations for Southern Gospel Recorded Album and Southern Gospel Recorded Song ("If You Knew Him"). The group released a second single, "Did I Mention", in early 2010. The song debuted on the March 2010 Singing News Charts at #47 and eventually made it to the #1 spot in July 2010. The group received 11 Top 5 nominations in the 2010 Singing News Fan Awards for Favorite Artist, Mixed Group, Male Vocalist, Female Vocalist, Horizon Individual, Young Artist, Alto, Lead, Songwriter, Album, & Song.

Tracy Stuffle experienced a cardiac arrest on Wednesday, August 11, 2010. Tracy had five blockages and needed to undergo open heart surgery. Doctors also discovered that Tracy was a diabetic. After his 10-hour surgery on August 13, he recovered sufficiently to return home less than a week after the cardiac incident.

After the National Quartet Convention in 2010, pianist, Bryan Elliott announced he would be departing to play for Gold City. In mid October 2010, it was announced that Troy Peach would be leaving the group and the baritone spot would be filled by Bryan Walker. Walker announced his departure on October 15, 2014. He was then replaced by past member, Troy Peach.

Bass Singer Tracy Stuffle died on Sunday February 4th, 2018 after suffering a massive stroke in 2013.

Line-ups

Discography
God's Little People (1988)
Royal Descendants (1991)
Grace (1993)
Full Circle (1994)
Crossings (1997)
Come To The Fountain (1998)
Absolutely Positively Live (2000)
Changed Forever (2001)
Hits & Hymns Volume I (2002)
Hits & Hymns Volume II (2002)
This Is The Day (2003)
Life Of Love (2004)
Remembering The Happy Goodmans (2005)
Come Thirsty (2006)
Look No Further (2007)
Come With Me (2008)
7 Hits (2009)
Almost Morning (2009)
Through the Night (2012)
Greatest (2013)
Into His Presence (2014)
Greatest Volume II (2015)
Sing (2015)
Testament (2017)
A Very Perry Christmas (2017)
 Keep Moving Along (2019)
John 3:16 (2022)

External links
Official Website
Twitter
Facebook

Family musical groups
Musical groups from Georgia (U.S. state)
Musical groups from Tennessee
Southern gospel performers